The Laka language is one of the Sara languages of Chad.

Laka language may also refer to:

 Laka language (China), a Loloish language spoken by the Yi people of China
 Laka Lau language, a Sara language of Nigeria
 Lau language, a Jukunoid language of eastern Nigeria previously subsumed under the label "Laka"

See also
 Lakka language, an Mbum language of Cameroon and Chad
 Lakkia language, a Kra-Dai language in China
 Laka (disambiguation)
 Lakka (disambiguation)